Laboratoria is an organization empowering women who dream of a better future to start and grow careers in technology. It seeks this through a 6-month totally remote bootcamp, focused on technical and life skills, aimed at women who haven´t been able to start their careers. After the bootcamp, they connect their graduates with quality jobs in the tech sector as web developers and user experience designers. Laboratoria also has a very powerful community of more than 3,000 women who are each playing a key role in a more diverse and competitive digital economy.

History
Laboratoria was created to revert the disadvantages women face in accessing quality jobs in the growing digital economy. It began with a pilot training program for 15 women and rapidly expanded, with 3,000 graduates in over six countries in Latin America. 

Since its foundation in Lima, Peru, in 2014, Laboratoria has expanded to Chile and México (2015), Brazil (2018), Colombia (2020) and Ecuador (2022). Today, due to it being a remote first company, it has been able to reach more countries in Latin America and beyond. Women from different cities and regions have been able to go through the bootcamp, thanks to the absence of geographic boundaries. It also has over 120 team members working daily to have a more profound social impact in the region. 

Over 3,000 women have graduated as web developers and UX designers, with an average job placement rate of 87% (since 2020). Laboratoria is also a source of female tech talent for leading companies in a wide variety of industries. More than 1,100 companies have hired Laboratoria talent.

Awards and recognitions
 Mariana Costa was chosen as one of the most influential, innovative and pioneering people in fintech, e-commerce, politics and digital infrastructure in the RoW100: Global Tech's Changemakers ranking (2022).
 McKinsey & Company recognizes Mariana Costa on its The Committed Innovator list, which highlights women in corporate, academic and entrepreneurial fields around the world who are creating groundbreaking breakthroughs in some of the most challenging issues on the planet. These women leaders are pioneering, expanding frontiers and building legacies in agriculture, banking, beauty, education, fashion, health and technology, 2021.
 Mariana Costa is recognized by Google.org as a "Leader to watch" in 2022. Google's philanthropic arm selected seven leaders in the world, including the Peruvian entrepreneur, the only representative from Latin America.
 Laboratoria was recognized as one of the 100 edtechs in Latin America in 2021 by HolonIQ, an intelligence platform that provides data and analysis of developments in the global market and annually publishes a ranking of the most promising startups in the region. The evaluation was made after a review of more than 2,000 edtechs.
 Mariana Costa was chosen by the Project Management Institute (PMI), an American organization with nearly 500,000 members in almost 100 countries, as one of the winners of the Future 50 in 2021, which features emerging leaders who are creating, building and transforming the world through remarkable projects, 2021.
 Bloomberg online presented a list of the 100 Innovators of 2021, in which they selected the Latinos who, during the pandemic, not only invented models, but also corrected their steps and even reinvented themselves to adapt to this new economic and social scenario.
 Mariana Costa Checa is part of the Wonderful Women of the World 2021 anthology, which – in comic format – shows the work of outstanding women around the world.
 Holon IQ 2020 Latam EdTech 100
 Transforming Lives Award A lquity, 2019
 Women Leading in Technology and Impact, Engineering for Change, 2018
 TEDxPlaceDeNations Speaker, 2018
 Equals in Tech Award – ITU, UN, Internet Society, 2018
 Change Agent Abie Award - AnitaB.org – Grace Hopper Celebration, 2018
 Ashoka Fellow – Mariana Costa, as Cofounder and CEO, since 2017 to the present day
 World Summit Awards, 2017.
 MIT Inclusive Innovation Challenge – Winner Matching Category, 2016
 BBC – 100 Most Influential Women, 2016
 DAI Innovation Into Action Challenge, 2016
 Google Rise Awards, 2015.

References

External links
 

2014 establishments in Peru
Non-profit organisations based in Peru
Organizations for women in science and technology
Computer science education
Women in computing
Ashoka Fellows